Nicolas Lang (born 1 May 1990) is a French professional basketball player, who currently plays for CSP Limoges of the LNB Pro A. Lang is a two-time French Pro A champion, as well as a two-time French Cup winner.

He signed a three-year extension with Limoges on 27 May 2020.

National team career
Lang played for the France national U18, U19 and U20 teams. Lang was on the championship team that won the 2010 FIBA Europe Under-20 Championship in Croatia. In 2014, Lang was selected for the pre-selection of the France national team for the 2014 FIBA World Cup.

References

1990 births
Living people
ASVEL Basket players
Élan Chalon players
French men's basketball players
Limoges CSP players
Metropolitans 92 players
Shooting guards
SIG Basket players
Small forwards
Sportspeople from Mulhouse